Siham Bayyumi (born 1949) is an Egyptian writer and journalist. She was born in Cairo and studied at Helwan University. She has worked as a journalist at the Cairo newspaper Al Gomhuria, and has published works of both fiction and non-fiction. Her books include the short story collection Al-Khayl Wa-Al-Layl. Her historical novel Ayyam al-Qabbuti dealt with the excavation of the Suez Canal. Her work has been translated into Italian by Elisabetta Bartuli and appeared in a 2001 anthology titled Rose del Cairo.

Selected works
 Kharait Lil-Mawj
 Al-Khayl Wa-Al-Layl: Qisas Qasirah
 Ayyam al Qabbuti

References

External links
 Extract from Ayyam al-Qabbuti published in Al-Ahram Hebdo (June 2003), translated from Arabic to French by Djamel Si-Larbi

1949 births
Writers from Cairo
Egyptian novelists
Journalists from Cairo
Living people
Helwan University alumni